Ansin Sports Complex is a multi-sport complex located in Miramar, Florida.

The track and field venue is one of only four Class 2 internationally certified tracks in the United States.

Major competitions
 2011 Pan American Junior Athletics Championships
 2022 National Senior Games

References

External links

Athletics (track and field) venues in Florida
Sports venues in Miami
Miramar, Florida